Aylett Hawes (April 21, 1768August 31, 1833) was a nineteenth-century doctor, politician, planter and slaveholder from Virginia.

Early life and education

Born in Culpeper County in the Colony of Virginia, Hawes received a private classical education. He then studied medicine and finished his education in Edinburgh, Scotland.

Career

Upon returning to Virginia, Hawes practiced medicine as well as bought several plantations in Culpeper County and what became Rappahannock County, Virginia, which he farmed using enslaved labor. He owned 25 slaves in Culpeper County in 1810. A decade later, Hawes owned 49 slaves. In the last census before his death, he owned 70 slaves.

Culpeper County voters elected Hawes as one of their two representatives in the Virginia House of Delegates. He won re-election several times, serving from 1802 to 1806, all alongside John Roberts.

In 1810, voters in what was then Virginia's 9th congressional district elected Hawes, who ran as a Democratic-Republican to the United States House of Representatives. However, the 1810 census necessitated redistricting, so in his re-election campaign, Hawes ran in Virginia's 10th congressional district, whose incumbent John Dawson was moved into Virginia's 11th congressional district, much as Hawes was moved from the 9th. Hawes won re-election twice before resigning to resume his medical practice and plantations in Culpeper and Rappahannock Counties. He was succeeded by fellow Democratic Republican George F. Strother, who had succeeded him in the Virginia House of Delegates about a decade earlier.

Death and legacy

Hawes died on his farm in Rappahannock County, Virginia, on August 31, 1833, and was interred on another plantation, in Sperryville, Virginia. He was the uncle of Richard Hawes, Albert Gallatin Hawes and Aylett Hawes Buckner.

References

1768 births
1833 deaths
Members of the Virginia House of Delegates
Farmers from Virginia
People from Culpeper County, Virginia
American planters
People from Rappahannock County, Virginia
Democratic-Republican Party members of the United States House of Representatives from Virginia
Hawes family
19th-century American politicians